The 1993–94 DFB-Pokal was the 51st season of the annual German football cup competition. 76 teams competed in the tournament of seven rounds which began on 1 August 1993 and ended on 14 May 1994. In the final Werder Bremen defeated Rot-Weiß Essen 3–1 thereby claiming their third title.

Matches

First round

Second round

Third round

The Borussia Mönchengladbach - Karlsruher SC tie was replayed on a neutral ground, after Karlsruhe's goalkeeper Oliver Kahn was injured by an object thrown by opposing supporters.

Round of 16

Quarter-finals

Semi-finals

Final

References

External links
 Official site of the DFB 
 Kicker.de 

1993-94
1993–94 in German football cups